Emma Vyssotsky (October 23, 1894 – May 12, 1975, née Emma T. R. Williams) was an American astronomer who was honored with the Annie J. Cannon Award in Astronomy in 1946.

Biography
Emma earned her bachelor's degree in mathematics at Swarthmore College in 1916 and worked at Smith College as an astronomy/mathematics demonstrator for a year before finding work at an insurance company as an actuary. In 1927, after receiving a Whitney Fellowship and a Bartol Scholarship, she enrolled in astronomy at Radcliffe College (now part of Harvard). There, she worked with Cecilia Payne on the "spectral line contours of hydrogen and ionized calcium throughout the spectral sequence."

Emma received her PhD in astronomy from Harvard College in 1930 for her dissertation titled, A Spectrophotometric Study of A Stars. At the time, she was only the third individual to be awarded a PhD in astronomy from Harvard.

She followed her husband, astronomer Alexander N. Vyssotsky, to the University of Virginia, where he was offered a professorship; she was offered an instructor position. She spent her astronomy career at the McCormick Observatory at the university, where her specialty was the motion of stars and the kinematics of the Milky Way. The couple worked together. [They were] studying stellar parallaxes by applying trigonometric functions to observations made on multiple photographic exposures. They discovered many of these parallaxes by attaching a special objective prism to the observatory's astrograph. Their research led to accurate calculations of stellar motions and the determination of the structure of galaxies.She worked at the observatory "for more than a dozen years" before the university promoted her to professor in 1945, but by then she had taken a medical leave of absence after contracting a debilitating illness, Malta Fever, which restricted her activities. Still, she continued to publish.

Personal life 
Emma Williams married the Russian-born astronomer Alexander N. Vyssotsky in 1929; they published jointly and worked together at the McCormick Observatory in Charlottesville, Virginia. They had one son, Victor A. Vyssotsky (a mathematician and computer scientist), who was involved in the Multics project and co-created the Darwin computer game.

Emma died in Winter Park, Florida two years after her husband's death.

Awards 
In 1946, she was awarded the Annie J. Cannon Award in Astronomy by the American Astronomical Society in recognition of her contributions to the field of stellar spectra.

Select publications 
Emma published much of her research under the name E. T. Williams. The couple would alternate the lead author role on their joint papers, with her name appearing first sometimes, and his name appearing first at other times.

 Vyssotsky, E. T. W. (1929). A Spectrophotometric Study of A Stars (Doctoral dissertation, Radcliffe College).

References

External links
 Alexander N. Vyssotsky (McCormick Museum)

1894 births
1975 deaths
People from Media, Pennsylvania
American women astronomers
Recipients of the Annie J. Cannon Award in Astronomy
University of Virginia faculty
20th-century American women scientists
20th-century American scientists
Harvard College alumni
Radcliffe College alumni
American women academics